The Santa Paula Elementary School District, founded in 1876 with the opening of the first elementary school in Santa Paula, California, until its merger into the Santa Paula Unified School District on July 1, 2013, governed the city's elementary schools and middle school.  In 1935, the board approved a tax levy that raised more funds for earthquake repairs.

Past members of the board of trustees and superintendents of the district were:

 Cecil Foster, trustee (1918-1926)
 George Bond, superintendent (circa 1938)
 R.E. Denley, superintendent (circa 1947)

Schools (in 2013)
 Thelma Bedell Elementary School
 Blanchard Elementary School
 Glen City Elementary School
 Isbell Middle School
 McKevett Elementary School
 Grace Thille Elementary School
 Barbara Webster Elementary School

References 

School districts in Ventura County, California
Santa Paula, California
1876 establishments in California
School districts established in 1876